Stephen M. Katz is an American cinematographer. He served as the cinematographer for the 1980 film The Blues Brothers.

Selected filmography 
 Angels Hard as They Come (1971)
 Messiah of Evil (1973)
 The Student Teachers (1973)
 Dirty O'Neil (1974)
 Switchblade Sisters (1975)
 Best Friends (1975)
 Las Vegas Lady (1975)
 The Four Deuces (1975)
 The Pom Pom Girls (1976)
 Bittersweet Love (1976)
 Joyride (1977)
 The Kentucky Fried Movie (1977)
 Our Winning Season (1978)
 The Little Dragons (1979)
 The Blues Brothers (1980)
 Last Resort (1986)
 'night, Mother (1986)
 Nice Girls Don't Explode (1987)
 Sister, Sister (1987)
 And God Created Woman (1988)
 18 Again! (1988)
 Who's Harry Crumb? (1989)
 Backstreet Dreams (1990)
 White Lie (1991)
 Watch It (1993)
 Arthur Miller's The American Clock (1993)
 My Summer Story (1994)
 Timemaster (1995)
 Gods and Monsters (1998)
 Baby Geniuses (1999)
 I'll Remember April (1999)
 Her Majesty (2001)
 The Dust Factory (2004)
 I'll Always Know What You Did Last Summer (2006)

References

External links 

Living people
Place of birth missing (living people)
Year of birth missing (living people)
American cinematographers